Pleasley is a civil parish in the Bolsover District of Derbyshire, England. The parish contains ten listed buildings that are recorded in the National Heritage List for England.   Of these, one is listed at Grade II*, the middle of the three grades, and the others are at Grade II, the lowest grade.  The parish contains the village of Pleasley and the surrounding area.  The listed buildings consist of a church, a medieval cross base, a dam and sluices on the River Meden and a bridge crossing it, a farmhouse, a pair of lodges, buildings remaining from a closed colliery, a village hall, and a war memorial.


Key

Buildings

References

Citations

Sources

 

Lists of listed buildings in Derbyshire